Cropping is the removal of part or all of the external flaps of an animal's ear. The procedure sometimes involves bracing and taping the remainder of the ears to train them to point upright. Almost exclusively performed on dogs, it is an old practice that was once done for perceived health, practical or cosmetic reasons. Veterinary science states there is no medical or physical advantage to the animal from the procedure, leading to concerns of animal cruelty over performing unnecessary surgery on animals. In modern times, cropping is banned in many nations, but is still legal in a limited number of countries. Where permitted, it is seen only in certain breeds of dog, such as the pit bull, Doberman Pinscher, Schnauzer, Great Dane, Boxer and Cane Corso.

History and purposes
In 2000, veterinarian Bruce Fogle wrote:

Traditional cropping 
Historically, cropping was performed on working dogs in order to decrease the risk of health complications, such as ear infections or hematomas. Crops were also performed on dogs that might need to fight, either while hunting animals that might fight back or while defending livestock herds from predators, or because they were used for pit-fighting sports such as dog fighting or bear-baiting.
The ears were an easy target for an opposing animal to grab or tear.

Cropping the ears of livestock guardian dogs was, and may still be, traditional in some pastoral cultures. The ears of working flock-defense dogs such as the Caucasian Shepherd Dog (Kavkazskaïa Ovtcharka)
and the Pastore Maremmano-Abruzzese were traditionally cropped to reduce the possibility of wolves or opponent-dogs getting a grip on them.

According to one description, cropping was carried out when puppies were weaned, at about six weeks. It was performed by an older or expert shepherd, using the ordinary blade shears used for shearing, well sharpened. The ears were cut either to a point like those of a fox, or rounded like those of a bear. The removed auricles were first grilled
given to the puppy to eat, in the belief that it would make him more "sour". An alternative method was to remove the ears from newborn puppies by twisting them off; however, this left almost no external ear on the dog. Both ear-cropping and the use of spiked collars were described more than three hundred years ago, as a defense against wolves.

Dogs may have their ears cropped, legally or not, for participation in dogfights, themselves illegal in many jurisdictions.

The procedure 
The veterinary procedure is known as "cosmetic otoplasty", and involves the removal of a portion of the pinnae, the external flap of the ear. Cropping is usually performed on puppies at 7 to 12 weeks of age. After 16 weeks, the procedure is more painful and the animal has greater pain memory. The ears are then bandaged. Long crops are taped until they heal into the proper shape. The procedure is recommended to be undertaken under general anaesthesia; opponents' primary concerns revolve around post-operative pain.

American veterinary schools do not generally teach cropping (or docking), and thus veterinarians who perform the practice have to learn on the job. There are also problems with amateurs performing ear-cropping, particularly at puppy mills.

In the last 100 years or so, ear cropping has been performed more often for cosmetic purposes. In nations and states where it remains legal, it is usually practiced because it is required as part of a breed standard for exhibition at dog shows. In the US, although tail-docking, dewclaw removal, and neutering procedures remain common, ear-cropping is declining, except within the dog show industry. Some show ring competitors state they would discontinue the practice altogether if they could still "win in the ring."

Examples of cropping styles

Animal welfare and law

The practice is illegal across most of Europe, including all countries that have ratified the European Convention for the Protection of Pet Animals, and most member countries of the Fédération Cynologique Internationale. It is illegal in regions of Spain and in some Canadian provinces. The situation in Italy is unclear; the ban effective 14 January 2007 may no longer be in force.

Ear-cropping is still widely practiced in the United States and parts of Canada, with approximately 130,000 puppies in the United States thought to have their ears cropped each year. The American Kennel Club (AKC) and Canadian Kennel Club both permit the practice. The AKC position is that ear cropping and tail docking are "acceptable practices integral to defining and preserving breed character and/or enhancing good health." While some individual states have attempted to ban ear-cropping, there is strong opposition from some dog breed organizations, who cite health concerns and tradition.

The American Veterinary Medical Association "opposes ear cropping and tail docking of dogs when done solely for cosmetic purposes" and "encourages the elimination of ear cropping and tail docking from breed standards".

In 2009, veterinary chain Banfield Pet Hospital announced they would no longer do tail docking, ear cropping or devocalization on dogs.

While it has been suggested the cropping may interfere with a dog's ability to communicate using ear signals, some also argue that cropping increases a dog's ability to communicate with ear signals. There has been no scientific comparative study of ear communication in cropped and uncropped dogs.

Legal status by country

Non-canine animals
Cropping of large portions of the pinnae of other animals is rare, although the clipping of identifying shapes in the pinnae of livestock, called earmarks, was common prior to the introduction of compulsory ear tags. Removal of portions of the ear of laboratory mice or neutered feral cats for identification, i.e. ear-notching or ear-tipping, is still used. The practice of cropping for cosmetic purposes is rare in non-canines, although some selectively bred animals have naturally small ears which can be mistaken for cropping.

See also
Docking (dog tails)
Overview of discretionary invasive procedures on animals
Ear shaping (human ears)

Notes

References

External links

Dogs
Cruelty to animals
Dog health
Animal welfare